Maxwell Trowbridge Gail Jr. (born April 5, 1943) is an American actor who has starred on stage, and in television and film roles. He is best known for his role as Detective Stan "Wojo" Wojciehowicz on the sitcom Barney Miller (1975–1982), which earned him two consecutive Primetime Emmy Award for Outstanding Supporting Actor in a Comedy Series nominations. Gail also won the 2019 and 2021 Daytime Emmy Award for Best Supporting Actor for his role as Mike Corbin on the soap opera General Hospital.

Early life
Gail was born in Detroit, Michigan, the son of Mary Elizabeth (née Scanlon) and Maxwell Trowbridge Gail, a businessman, and raised in Grosse Ile, Michigan. He has a twin sister, actress Mary Gail.

He attended Williams College, and was later an instructor for the University Liggett School before becoming an actor. His acting debut came in 1970 for the Little Fox Theatre in San Francisco, California, playing Chief Bromden in the original stage production of One Flew Over the Cuckoo's Nest. In 1973, he reprised this role in his New York stage debut.

Career

Gail is best known for his television role as Det. Stan "Wojo" Wojciehowicz in the sitcom Barney Miller (1975–1982). Gail's best-known feature film role is in D.C. Cab (1983) as Harold, the owner of the D.C. Cab taxi company. He directed several episodes of Barney Miller as Maxwell Gail.

In 1984, Gail was featured in the monodrama The Babe on Broadway. This stage play was filmed and later featured on PBS. Gail has starred in other TV series, including Whiz Kids (1983) as Llewellan Farley Jr., an investigative reporter who is friends with a group of teenaged computer hackers. He worked on the short-lived Normal Life (1990). He has appeared on the TV series Sons & Daughters (2006).

Gail has made many guest appearances on TV shows such as: Walker, Texas Ranger ("Whitewater"); Cannon, Dr. Quinn, Medicine Woman, Due South, The Streets of San Francisco, Paul Sand in Friends and Lovers, Murder, She Wrote, The Drew Carey Show, Hawaii Five-0, Quantum Leap, Psych,  Longmire, Gary Unmarried, NCIS, Scorpion, and Mad Men.

Gail appeared as Brooklyn Dodgers manager Burt Shotton in the 2013 film 42,  about Jackie Robinson's first two years as a member of the Dodgers organization, including his first year of playing at the major-league level in 1947.

Gail runs Full Circle, a production company that has featured documentaries on such subjects as Agent Orange, Native Americans, and nuclear issues.

Gail stepped into the recast role of Mike Corbin on General Hospital. He debuted on February 5, 2018, and went on to win the 2019 Daytime Emmy Award for Best Supporting Actor.

Personal life
Gail's first wife, Willie Bier, died of cancer in 1986 after three years of marriage. The experience inspired Gail to be the narrator of the alternative medicine film documentary Hoxsey: When Healing Becomes a Crime (1988). They have a daughter, India. His second wife, Nan, and he have two children, Maxwell and Grace. They separated amicably in 2000. He has been in a relationship with Chris Kaul since 2007. Gail's daughter Grace Gail, who later became a model, married actor Adam Rodriguez in 2016. They have three children, including son Bridgemont Bernard Rodriguez who was born on March 16, 2020.

Selected filmography

 1971 The Organization as Rudy
 1971 Dirty Harry as Tunnel Hoodlum #1 (uncredited)
 1975 Night Moves as Stud
 1977 Curse of the Black Widow (TV movie) as Ragsdale
 1980 Cardiac Arrest as Leigh Gregory
 1980 The Aliens Are Coming aka Alien Force (TV movie) as Russ Garner
 1983 D.C. Cab as Harold
 1984 Heartbreakers as King
 1986 Where are the Children as Clay Eldridge
 1986 Matlock as Lieutenant Chet Webber
 1988 Man Against the Mob as Judah Best
 1989 Murder, She Wrote as Stanley Holmes,  “Dead Letter” episode
 1991 Our Shining Moment (TV Movie) as John McGuire Jr.
 1994 Dangerous Touch as Jasper Stone
 1994 Pontiac Moon as Jerome Bellamy
 1994 Deadly Target as Captain Peters
 1995 Home Improvement as Officer Carl Keegan
 1996 Good Luck as Farmer John
 1996 "Dr. Quinn Medicine Woman" as Mr. Edwin James (Dying father)
 1996 Forest Warrior as Sheriff Ramsey
 1997 Beyond Belief: Fact or Fiction as Buck / Grandpa
 1999 Judgment Day as General Bill Meech
 2001 Facing the Enemy as Thomas Galloway
 2006 Tillamook Treasure as Grandpa Kimbell
 2007 Dexter (TV series) as Banana Boat Tour Guide
 2009 You Don't Know Jack: The Jack Soo Story as himself
 2009 Always and Forever (TV movie) as Bill Anderson
 2012-2013 Psych (TV series) as Jerry Carp
 2013 42 as Burt Shotton
 2015 The Frontier as Sean
 2015 I'll See You In My Dreams as Carl
 2015 Mad Men (TV series) as Floyd
 2015 Underdog Kids as Charlie Walker
 2015 Longmire (TV series) as Thomas Hoyt
 2015 Review (TV series) as Forrest's Father
 2017 The Hero as Gary Babcock
 2017 Hawaii Five-0 (TV series) as Bill Walker
 2017 Abundant Acreage Available as Hans
 2018-2021 General Hospital as Mike Corbin
 2018 The Cool Kids as Robert

References

External links

LAP.org

1943 births
American male film actors
American male television actors
Living people
Male actors from Detroit
Williams College alumni
20th-century American male actors
21st-century American male actors
American male stage actors
People from Grosse Ile, Michigan
Daytime Emmy Award winners
Daytime Emmy Award for Outstanding Supporting Actor in a Drama Series winners